John Fletcher may refer to:

Politicians
John Fletcher (MP for Rye) (by 1490–1545 or later)
John Fletcher (Canadian commissioner), sent to frontier Manitoba, in 1816, with William Bachelor Coltman when rival fur traders started killing one another
Sir John Fletcher, 1st Baronet (1841–1924), British MP for Hampstead
John Fletcher (New Zealand politician) (1888–1934), New Zealand Member of Parliament for Grey Lynn
John Fletcher (Queensland politician) (1883–1965), Queensland state MP and cricketer
John Fletcher (South Australian politician) (1883–1958), South Australian state MP

Religion
John William Fletcher (1729–1785), early Methodist divine
John Fletcher (priest) (died 1848), English Roman Catholic priest and writer
John Wesley Fletcher (1940–1996), Assemblies of God pastor

Others
John Aubrey-Fletcher (1912–1992), British soldier and cricketer
John C. Fletcher, American ethicist, see American Society for Bioethics and Humanities
John Gould Fletcher (1886–1950), Pulitzer Prize winner
John Fletcher (businessman) (born 1951), former CEO of Australian retail company Coles Group
John Fletcher (cricketer, born 1893), Australian cricketer
John Fletcher (playwright) (1579–1625), Jacobean playwright
John Fletcher (rower), American rower, gold winner at the 1979 World Rowing Championships
John Fletcher (tubist) (1941–1987), London Symphony Orchestra
John Edward Fletcher (1940–1992), Australian-British scholar
Jack Fletcher, American voice actor
John Walter Fletcher (1847–1918), pioneer of soccer (association football) in Australia

John Fletcher (American football), college football player
John Fletcher (ice hockey), American ice hockey goaltender and coach

See also